The Alabama Highway Patrol is the de facto highway patrol organization for the U.S. state of Alabama, and which has full jurisdiction anywhere in the State. The Alabama Highway Patrol was created in 1936. Since its establishment, 29 officers have died while on duty. It is subordinate to the Alabama Department of Public Safety, which is itself subordinate to the Alabama Law Enforcement Agency.

History

First pony car vehicles 
In 1971 the Alabama Highway Patrol became the first police organization in the United States to use downsized vehicles for regular highway patrol duties. This pre-dated, among others, the Camaros and Mustangs that were used by other departments years later. AMC Javelins were the first pony cars used as police cars by any U.S. organization.

The Alabama Highway Patrol evaluated two versions supplied by Reinhardt AMC of Montgomery, Alabama: a 1971 AMC Javelin SST with a  V8 and a 1971 Javelin-AMX with a  V8 engine. Because they were so different than the traditional police cars, the Javelin AMX "was the most abused police car in the history of Alabama". The "401-cu.in. V-8, three-speed automatic and 2.87 gears were good for about 140 mph, by which point the nose of the car started to get rather light".

After this trial, the first order was for 61 cars finished in silver and ten unmarked cars in various colors. Due to further cost-cutting reasons they were base model Javelins with heavy-duty "fleet" equipment, "machine wheels" with Goodyear Polyglas raised-white-lettered tires, and rear spoilers (normally available only on Javelin AMX models) to display the "state trooper" markings on the rear of each car. A  "401" emblem covered the holes in the spoiler to replace the AMX emblem. During 1972, a total of 62 Javelins were ordered: 12 in all silver paint, 42 were finished with the hoods, decklids, and spoilers in blue over silver body as the new police car scheme, as well as eight were unmarked cars in various colors. The 1972 models were only available from AMC as "SST" versions and included additional exterior and interior trim. The 1972 versions were delivered by Reinhardt AMC and also by Bill Whitten AMC/Datsun in Birmingham.

A total of 132 Javelins were purchased during 1971 and 1972. The Javelins came with   AMC V8 engines. The last of the AMC Javelins was retired in 1979, and one of the original cars is now part of the Museum at DPS Headquarters.

James Fowler 
Trooper James Bonard Fowler became a significant player in escalating the acute racial conflict that led to the Selma to Montgomery marches in the civil rights movement. As a corporal in the Alabama State Police in 1965, he shot and killed an unarmed black man, Jimmie Lee Jackson, but was not prosecuted and convicted for the killing until 45 years later. In a later incident, he shot and killed an unarmed black man by the name of Nathan Johnson. Johnson had been arrested for suspicion of drunken driving on U.S. Highway 31 and was fatally shot by Fowler at the Alabaster, Alabama Police Department.

Weapons issued 
The current issued sidearms for Alabama state troopers include the Glock Model 17 Gen 5 and the Glock 45, both in 9mm. Additional weapons provided to troopers include the Bushmaster M4-type carbine rifle and the Benelli M4 police magnum shotgun. Less-than-lethal weapons include OC (pepper) spray, ASP collapsible batons, and tasers.

Troops
The Alabama Highway Patrol's troops cover the following counties as listed:

Rank structure 
The Alabama Department of Public Safety has a paramilitary rank structure and the rank structure is as listed:

See also 

 List of law enforcement agencies in Alabama
 State patrol
 Highway patrol

References

External links 
 Alabama Highway Patrol website
 Alabama Department of Public Safety website

State law enforcement agencies of Alabama
Government agencies established in 1936
1936 establishments in Alabama